Italy competed at the 1966 European Athletics Championships in Budapest, Hungary, from 30 August to 4 September 1966.

Medalists

Top eight

Men

Women
No Italian female athlete has been classified in the top eight at these editions of the European Championships.

See also
 Italy national athletics team

References

External links
 EAA official site

Italy at the European Athletics Championships
Nations at the 1966 European Athletics Championships
1966 in Italian sport